is a Japanese manga artist. He is best known for Murder Princess and the manga adaptation of Comic Party, the latter which he drew upon his own experiences as a dōjinshi creator at Comiket. His most recent series, Ratman, ended in 2013.

Works
 Comic Party (5 volumes. issuance of the final volume in March 2005) MediaWorks
 Murder Princess (2005年 10月) メディアワークス PRINCESS Murder (2005 Mon 10) MediaWorks
 Gensou Shuugi -FANTASISM- 幻想主義 (2006年4月、 ) 角川コミックス・エース Fantasy principle (2006 Mon 4) Kadokawa Comics Ace
 Ratman (2007年8月号 – 2013年8月号) 月刊少年エース Ratman (August 2007 to August 2013) Shōnen Ace
 Date A Live (2014年1月号 – 2014年12月号、原作：橘公司、キャラクター原案：つなこ ) 月刊少年エース (Written by Kōshi Tachibana with illustrated by Tsunako) Shōnen Ace

External links 
 Official Website (archived on archive.org, 25 March 2016) 
 Official Twitter page 
 
 Ed Chavez podcast interview

Manga artists
Living people
Year of birth missing (living people)